Decimal degrees (DD) is a notation for expressing latitude and longitude geographic coordinates as decimal fractions of a degree. DD are used in many geographic information systems (GIS), web mapping applications such as OpenStreetMap, and GPS devices. Decimal degrees are an alternative to using sexagesimal degrees (degrees, minutes, and seconds - DMS notation).  As with latitude and longitude, the values are bounded by ±90° and ±180° respectively.

Positive latitudes are north of the equator, negative latitudes are south of the equator. Positive longitudes are east of the Prime Meridian; negative longitudes are west of the Prime Meridian. Latitude and longitude are usually expressed in that sequence, latitude before longitude. The abbreviation dLL has been used in the scientific literature with locations in texts being identified as a tuple within square brackets, for example [54.5798,-3.5820]. The appropriate decimal places are used,<ref>W. B. Whalley, 2021.'Mapping small glaciers, rock glaciers and related features in an age of retreating glaciers: using decimal latitude-longitude locations and 'geomorphic information tensors,Geografia Fisica e Dinamica Quaternaria 2021:44 55-67,DOI 10.4461/ GFDQ.2021.44.4</ref> negative values are given as hyphen-minus, Unicode 002D.

Precision
The equator is divided into 360 degrees of longitude, so each degree at the equator represents . As one moves away from the equator towards a pole, however, one degree of longitude is multiplied by the cosine of the latitude, decreasing the distance, approaching zero at the pole. The number of decimal places required for a particular precision at the equator is:

Elevation also introduces a small error: at  elevation, the radius and surface distance is increased by 0.001 or 0.1%. Because the earth is not flat, the precision of the longitude part of the coordinates increases the further from the equator you get. The precision of the latitude part does not increase so much, more strictly however, a meridian arc length per 1 second depends on the latitude at the point in question. The discrepancy of 1 second meridian arc length between equator and pole is about  because the earth is an oblate spheroid.

Example
A DMS value is converted to decimal degrees using the formula:

For instance, the decimal degree representation for
38° 53′ 23″ N, 77° 00′ 32″ W

(the location of the United States Capitol) is
38.8897°, -77.0089°

In most systems, such as OpenStreetMap, the degree symbols are omitted, reducing the representation to
38.8897,-77.0089

To calculate the D, M and S components, the following formulas can be used:

Note that with this formula only  can be negative and only  may have a fractional value.

 See also 
ISO 6709 Standard representation of geographic point location by coordinates''
geo URI scheme

References 

Geographic data and information
Geographic coordinate systems